The 7th Asian Film Awards took place on 18 March 2013. In the 14 award categories, 30 films with 70 nominees from across Asia were recognized for their excellence in cinema. The nominees were announced by actor Andy Lau who also served as president of the judging panel. The ceremony was held at the Grand Hall of the Hong Kong Convention and Exhibition Center. 

Michelle Yeoh received the honour of the Lifetime Achievement award.

Jury
Andy Lau (Hong Kong)
Ronald Arguelles (Philippines)
John Badalu (Indonesia)
Patricia Cheng (Hong Kong)
Kenji Ishizaka (Japan)
Christian Jeune (France)
Dai Jinhua (China)
Eric Khoo (Singapore)
Kong Rithdee (Thailand)
Wen Tien-hsiang (Taiwan)
Jacob Wong (Hong Kong)

Winners and nominees
Winners are listed first and highlighted in bold.

People's Choice Awards

Special awards

 Excellence in Asian Cinema Award

 Michelle Yeoh 

 The Asian Film Award for 2012’s Top Grossing Asian Film

 Lost in Thailand

References

External links

Asian Film Awards ceremonies
2012 film awards
2013 in Hong Kong
Film
Hong Kong